Millroy the Magician is a novel by American writer Paul Theroux. It was published in 1993 by Hamish Hamilton in the UK and by Random House the following year in the US, where it was chosen as one of the New York Times notable books of the year. The novel has been identified as one of the best of the 1990s. It is a satire of American consumer culture and love of fast food, and contains elements of parable and magic realism.

Plot synopsis
The book concerns lonely teenager Jilly Farina and her relationship with Millroy. He is performing and calls her out of the audience and tells her he will train her to be his assistant. Millroy leaves the travelling fair and together with Jilly embarks on a mission to transform the food habits of America; converting them to Bible-based vegetarianism and promising his followers that they will live to be 200. His evangelical fervour is backed up by miraculous tricks but attracts growing opposition. He goes on to create a top-rating television show and chain of 'Day One' diners staffed by young volunteers. As his public success grows Jilly becomes increasingly uncomfortable in her role as his confidante.

Reception
Positive review extracts from the rear cover of the 1994 Penguin edition:

The magic in Millroy is brilliantly done ... This is Theroux's best book for a very long time - Jonathan Raban in the TLS
Magical ... this is Paul Theroux's best novels for some while ... the real success is Millroy himself, who acts unpredictably whenever the reader feels that he has his measure - Paul Bailey in the Daily Telegraph
A hugely ambitious, capacious fiction that manages to be at once entertaining and unsettling - Salman Rushdie in the Independent on Sunday
Fresh and unexpected ... this very accomplished, confident book is among his best - Philip Hensher in The Guardian

References

External links
 A diner serving God: Millroy the Magician review from The Independent by D. J. Taylor, Saturday, 23 October 1993.
 No mere digestive tract review from The Independent by Salman Rushdie, Sunday, 10 October 1993
 Salvation Through Weight Control review from the New York Times by Charles Johnson, March 6, 1994, Sunday, Late Edition - Final.

1993 American novels
American magic realism novels
Fictional characters who use magic
Fictional cult leaders
Hamish Hamilton books
New religious movements in popular culture
Novels about consumerism
Novels by Paul Theroux
Novels set in the United States
Novels about magic
Vegetarian-related mass media